Austin Gleeson (born 27 June 1995) is an Irish hurler who plays for Waterford Senior Championship club Mount Sion and at inter-county level with the Waterford senior hurling team. He usually lines out as a centre-forward but can also be deployed as a centre-back. He is the younger brother of Jessica Gleeson, the Republic of Ireland women's national team soccer player.

Playing career

De La Salle College

Gleeson first came to prominence as a hurler with De La Salle College. He played in every grade of hurling before eventually joining the college's senior hurling team and lined out in several Harty Cup campaigns.

Waterford Institute of Technology

As a student at the Waterford Institute of Technology, Gleeson joined the senior hurling team during his second year. On 1 March 2015, he was selected at left wing-forward when WIT faced the University of Limerick in the Fitzgibbon Cup final. Gleeson spent much of the game at full-forward and score a point from a sideline cut in the 0-21 to 3-12 draw. He retained his position for the replay on 11 March but was forced off with a hamstring injury after just four minutes in the 2-18 to 1-14 defeat.

Mount Sion

Gleeson joined the Mount Sion club when he was 8-year-old and played in all grades at juvenile and underage levels, winning championship medals in the under-14 and under-16 grades. He made his first appearance for the club's senior team during the 2012 Waterford Championship.

On 5 October 2014, Gleeson lined out at centre-back when Mount Sion faced Ballygunner in the Waterford Senior Championship final. He ended the game on the sideline after receiving two yellow cards in the 2-16 to 0-09 defeat.

Waterford

Minor and under-21

Gleeson first lined out for Waterford as a member of the minor team during the 2012 Munster Championship. He made his first appearance for the team on 2 May when he was introduced as a 45th-minute substitute in a 1-20 to 3-13 defeat of Clare.

Gleeson was again eligible for the minor grade in 2013 and joined the starting fifteen as a centre-back. On 14 July, he scored 0-03, including two frees, in a 2-19 apiece draw with Limerick in the Munster final. Gleeson retained his position at centre-back for the replay on 23 July, however, he ended on the losing side following a 1-20 to 4-08 defeat. On 8 September, he scored a point from a free when Waterford defeated Galway by 1-21 to 0-16 in the All-Ireland final.

Gleeson joined the Waterford under-21 team in advance of the 2014 Munster Championship. He made his first appearance for the team on 16 July 2014 and top scored for Waterford with 0-07 in a 3-18 to 0-16 defeat by Cork.

After a disappointing 2015 Munster Championship, Gleeson was selected for the under-21 team for a third successive season in 2016. On 27 July, he scored 0-05 from centre-back and claimed the man of the match award after a 2-19 to 0-15 defeat of Tipperary in the Munster final. On 10 September, Gleeson won an All-Ireland medal after scoring 0-02 from centre-back in a 5-15 to 0-14 defeat of Galway in the final. He ended the season by being named in the centre-back position on the Team of the Year.

Senior

Gleeson was added to the Waterford senior panel prior to the start of the 2014 National League. He made his first appearance for the team on 23 March 2014 when he lined out at left corner-forward in a 4-22 to 0-14 defeat by Kilkenny. Gleeson made his Munster Championship debut on 25 May 2014 when he scored 1-02 from left wing-forward in a 1-21 apiece draw with Cork.

On 3 May 2015, Gleeson was named at centre-back but played much of the game at right wing-back when Waterford faced Cork in the National League final. He scored 0-02 and collected a winners' medal following the 1-24 to 0-17 victory. On 12 July 2015, Gleeson scored 0-02 from right wing-back when Waterford were beaten for the fourth time in six seasons by Tipperary in the Munster final. He ended the season by being nominated for an All-Star.

On 1 May 2016, Gleeson was at centre-back when Waterford lined out in the National League final. He scored 0-02 before being substituted in the 63rd minute as Waterford drew 0-22 apiece with Clare. Gleeson switched to centre-forward and scored 0-03 in the replay, which Waterford lost by 1-23 to 2-19. On 10 July, he scored 0-02 from left corner-forward when Waterford suffered a 5-19 to 0-13 defeat by Tipperary in the Munster final. Gleeson ended the season by becoming only the second player ever to win the Hurler of the Year and Young Hurler of the Year awards in the same year. He also claimed the centre-forward berth on the All-Star team.

On 3 September 2017, Gleeson was named at centre-forward when Waterford faced Galway in the All-Ireland final. He ended the game as a runner-up following Galway's 0-26 to 2-17 victory. Gleeson ended the season by securing a third successive All-Star nomination.

Gleeson's 2018 season was blighted by a series of injuries. A pulled quad hampered him during the early rounds of the National League while he also suffered an infected cut on his ankle. Just before the start of the Munster Championship he sustained a hamstring injury after playing just 14 minutes of a club game with Mount Sion.

On 31 March 2019, Gleeson was named at midfield but lined out at centre-forward when Waterford faced Limerick in the National League final. He scored 0-02, including a point from a sideline, in the 1-24 to 0-19 defeat.

Career statistics

Honours 

Mount Sion

Waterford Junior Football Championship (2): 2018, 2021

Waterford
National Hurling League (1): 2015
All-Ireland Under-21 Hurling Championship (1): 2016
Munster Under-21 Hurling Championship (1): 2016
All-Ireland Minor Hurling Championship (1): 2013

Awards
All Stars Hurler of the Year (1): 2016
All Stars Young Hurler of the Year (1): 2016
GAA GPA All Stars Awards (1): 2016

References 

1995 births
Living people
Alumni of Waterford Institute of Technology
Irish engineers
Mount Sion hurlers
Waterford inter-county hurlers
Waterford IT hurlers